Pamela Harris may refer to:
 Pamela Harris (photographer) (born 1940), American photographer
 Pamela Harris (judge) (born 1962), American federal judge
 Pamela Harris (politician), assemblywoman from New York
 Pamela E. Harris (born 1983), Mexican-American mathematician and educator